Pareshaanpur is an upcoming Indian  Comedy film directed by debutant director Dilip Keshav Mukharaiya. The film presented by Oorja Films Creation stars Urmila Mahanta and Ameet Dawar in the lead roles, with Shakti Kapoor, Asrani, Shakti Mohan, Manoj Joshi, Sitaram Panchal, Raj Zutshi, Sunil Pal, Pitobash, Kanchan Pagare, Susheel Pandey, Nishant Bhardwaj, Sunny singh, Sania Kaur, Sona Bhandari, Roselyn Dsoza, Sahil, Vyom Singh, Chirag Jain, Sandeep Patila, Surinder Farishta, Isha Tewari and Tanima. It is a story of a village called "Shaanpur", but they are being taunted as well insulted as "bad omen" because the villagers believe there is so much of "PareShaan" in spite of "Shaan" in the village. Even in a simple thing that happens to their life they mix up with shagun and apshagun without using their logical reasoning.

Cast
 Urmila Mahanta
 Ameet Dawar
 Shakti Kapoor
 Asrani
 Pitobash
 Shakti Mohan
 Manoj Joshi
 Sitaram Panchal
 Sunil Pal
 Kanchan Pagare
 Susheel Pandey
 Nishant Bhardwaj
 Sunny Singh
 Tanima
 Isha Tewari  
 Ramesh Goyal
 Vijay Gupta
 Shankar Singh
 Babita Thakur
 Sania Kaur
 Surinder Farishta
 Sandeep Patila
 Harpal Singh
 Jyot Kaur
 Sahil
 Roselyn Dsoza
 Sona Bhandari
 Vyom Singh
 Chirag Jain

Music
Music of the film is given by Raaj Aashoo. There are five songs in the movie sung by Shaan, Sunidhi Chauhan, Shreya Ghoshal, Kunal Ganjawala, Raja Hasan, Lagnajita Chakraborty and Bhanu.

Development
Pareshaanpur is filmed and picturized in and around the locations of Punjab, Nagpur, Kolhapur and Vajreshwari

References

External links

 
 

2015 films
2010s Hindi-language films
Indian drama films